Lebewohl, Fremde is a 1991 German drama film directed by Tevfik Başer. It was screened in the Un Certain Regard section at the 1991 Cannes Film Festival.

Cast
 Grażyna Szapołowska as Karin
 Müsfik Kenter as Deniz
 Gustav-Peter Wöhler as Claus
 Badi Uzzaman as Badi
 Ayub Khan Din as Sehrat
 Werner Eichhorn as Bischoff
 Charlie Rinn as Löffelholz
 Uta Prelle as Tochter von Löffelholz
 Julia Lindig as Kellnerin
 Achim Schülke as Pastor Abdoulaye
 Abdoulaye Diop as Afrikaner
 Dieter Ohlendiek as Kommissar
 Dagmar Cassens as Kassiererin
 Szoka Duzar as Frau von Deniz

References

External links

1991 films
1990s German-language films
1991 drama films
Films directed by Tevfik Başer
German drama films
1990s German films